Elachista rikkeae is a moth of the family Elachistidae which is endemic to Spain.

References

rikkeae
Moths described in 1992
Endemic fauna of Spain
Moths of Europe